The Golden Voyage of Sinbad is a 1973 fantasy adventure film directed by Gordon Hessler and featuring stop motion effects by Ray Harryhausen. Based on the Arabian Nights tales of Sinbad the Sailor, it is the second of three Sinbad films released by Columbia Pictures, the others being The 7th Voyage of Sinbad (1958) and Sinbad and the Eye of the Tiger (1977). The film stars John Phillip Law, Tom Baker, Takis Emmanuel and Caroline Munro. It was a worldwide box office hit and won the first Saturn Award for Best Fantasy Film.

Plot
While sailing, Sinbad comes across a golden tablet dropped by a mysterious flying creature. That night, he dreams about a man dressed in black, repeatedly calling his name, as well as a beautiful girl with an eye tattooed on the palm of her right hand.

A sudden storm throws the ship off course, and Sinbad and his men find themselves near a coastal town in the country of Marabia. Swimming to the beach, Sinbad encounters the man from his dream, an evil magician named Koura, who demands that he turn over the amulet. Sinbad narrowly escapes into the city and meets the Grand Vizier of Marabia, who has been acting as regent following the death of the sultan, who had no heir. The Vizier, who wears a golden mask to hide his disfigured face, explains that Sinbad's amulet is but one piece of a puzzle, of which the Vizier has another. The Vizier relates to Sinbad a legend, which claims that the three pieces, when joined together, will reveal a map showing the way to the fabled Fountain of Destiny on the lost continent of Lemuria. He who takes the three pieces to the Fountain will receive "youth, a shield of darkness and a crown of untold riches".

Sinbad agrees to help the Vizier in his quest for the Fountain and they join forces against Koura, who is bent on using the Fountain's gifts to conquer Marabia. Koura had previously locked the Vizier in a room and set it on fire, resulting in the disfiguring of the Vizier's face. The creature that dropped the gold tablet was Koura's minion, a homunculus created by his black magic. Koura uses the creature to spy on Sinbad and the Vizier and learn of their plans. When Sinbad and the Vizier discover and catch the homunculus, it destroys itself.

Shortly afterward, Sinbad meets the woman in his dream, a slave girl named Margiana. Her master hires Sinbad to make a man out of his lazy, no-good son Haroun. Sinbad agrees on the condition that Margiana comes along. Koura hires a ship and a crew of his own and follows Sinbad, using his magic several times to try to stop Sinbad. However, each attempt drains away part of his life force, and he ages noticeably each time.

On his journey, Sinbad encounters numerous perils, including a wooden siren figurehead on his ship, animated by Koura's magic, which manages to steal the map, which enables Koura to locate Lemuria. The wizard uses another homunculus to overhear the Oracle of All Knowledge describe to Sinbad what he will face in his search for the Fountain. Koura seals the men inside the Oracle's cave, but Sinbad uses a makeshift rope to get everyone out. Haroun manages to destroy the homunculus as it attacks Sinbad. After he is captured by hostile natives, Koura animates a six-armed statue of Kali, causing the natives to set him free. Sinbad and his men arrive soon after, fight and defeat Kali. As she falls and breaks apart, they find the final piece of the puzzle within Kali's shattered remains. The natives capture Sinbad and his crew, but after they see the eye tattoo on Margiana's hand, they instead decide to sacrifice her to a one-eyed centaur, the natives' God of the Single Eye and the Fountain's Guardian of Evil.

Koura arrives at the Fountain of Destiny. When he drops the first piece of the tablet into the Fountain, his life force is restored. He then summons the centaur, which fights the Fountain's Guardian of Good, a griffin. Meanwhile, Sinbad and the others escape, rescue Margiana and reach the Fountain. They watch as the centaur kills the griffin with Koura's aid, then Sinbad slays the centaur. Koura drops the second piece into the Fountain, which turns him invisible (the "shield of darkness"), and engages Sinbad in a swordfight. Sinbad is barely able to fend off his invisible foe, until Koura makes a fatal mistake by stepping in the Fountain itself, which reveals his silhouette, enabling Sinbad to kill him. Sinbad then drops in the third piece, and a jewel-encrusted crown rises from the depths. Instead of donning it, Sinbad gives the crown to the Vizier. When the Vizier dons the crown, his mask dissolves, revealing his restored, unscarred face.

Their quest completed, Sinbad and his crew journey back to Marabia. When Margiana asks him why he did not take the crown himself, Sinbad explains that he enjoys his freedom more than kinghood. With Margiana as his wife, and Haroun as a new member of his crew, they sail into the sunset.

Cast
 John Phillip Law as Sinbad, the protagonist
 Tom Baker as Prince Koura, the main antagonist of the film (Christopher Lee was a front-runner to play Koura). Baker's performance helped him get the lead role of the Fourth Doctor in the TV series Doctor Who, because the show's producer, Barry Letts, was impressed with his performance.
 Takis Emmanuel as Achmed (Emmanuel was dubbed by Robert Rietti)
 Caroline Munro as Margiana 
 Douglas Wilmer as the Grand Vizier of Marabia
 Grégoire Aslan as Hakim (as Gregoire Aslan)
 David Garfield as Abdul (as John D. Garfield)
 Kurt Christian as Haroun
 Martin Shaw as Rachid
 Aldo Sambrell as Omar 
 Robert Shaw as the Oracle of All Knowledge (uncredited)

Screenwriter Brian Clemens helped Munro land the role of Margiana:
I got the part – I had been signed by Hammer, for one year, for a contract, out of which I did two films, one being Dracula AD 1972, and the second one being Captain Kronos – Vampire Hunter, which, kind of, would come full-circle, to Sinbad. It was written and directed by Brian Clemens, who wrote the screenplay for The Golden Voyage of Sinbad, so, I was lucky enough to be chosen for Captain Kronos, and they were searching for somebody to do Sinbad, and they wanted a big name, somebody American, or well-known, but Brian said "No". He kept lobbying Charles Schneer [producer] and Ray Harryhausen — saying: 'I think you should come and look at the rushes, and see what you think, because I think she's right'. So, they said "No", but, eventually, Brian persuaded them to do that, and they saw the rushes, and that was how I got the part.

Production

Schneer said he and Harryhausen chose to do another Sinbad movie as they "felt it was time to go back to the Arabian Nights, since no one else has been dealing with it and we had a great success with it in the late fifties. We felt there was a new audience that was ready for it. We knew of no other producers who were considering this type of material, largely because they probably didn't know how to handle it on a basis where it became economically viable". Harryhausen did a dozen master sketches which, Schneer said "we felt would be intriguing and interesting and characteristic of the period". They then hired Brian Clemens to do a screenplay based on the sketches. Harryhausen was given a co producer credit in this film to reflect his greater involvement in the writing, editing and casting process.

Schneer said Law was cast at the suggestion of Columbia: "He wasn't very athletic, and he didn't handle a sword as well as Kerwin did. Frankly, he was kind of flat-footed, but he did the best he could. He used a Middle Eastern accent that I wasn't altogether pleased about, either".

Caroline Munro was given the female lead. Schneer said: "We wanted her to project that sex appeal, because that was what was happening at the time in the film business. But we were still making a G-rated picture, so we went for G-rated sex appeal".

Producers Charles Schneer and Ray Harryhausen based their production in Spain (Madrid as well as the island of Majorca) to take advantage of the local rugged scenery. At one point the possibility of filming some scenes at the landmark Alhambra palace in Granada was raised, but rental fees demanded by local authorities proved prohibitive. Eventually the company was able to film at the Royal Palace of La Almudaina. Other scenes were done in the Caves of Artà (the temple of the Oracle) and the Torrent de Pareis

It was filmed from 19 June to August 1972.

An early charcoal/pencil illustration showed the one-eyed centaur battling a giant Neanderthal-like creature, who was later ultimately replaced by a griffin in the final version. The idea of the Neanderthal was later featured in Sinbad and the Eye of the Tiger (1977).

Adaptations
 Marvel Comics published a two-issue adaptation in Worlds Unknown #7–8 (June & Aug. 1974). Titled The Golden Voyage of Sinbad: Land of the Lost, it was scripted by Len Wein, penciled by George Tuska and inked by Vince Colletta.

Home media
The film was released in the United Kingdom on VHS in 1991.

Blu-ray ALL America - Twilight Time - The Limited Edition Series
 Picture Format: 1.66:1 (1080p 24fps) [AVC MPEG-4]
 Soundtrack(s): English (DTS-HD Master Audio 5.1)
 Subtitles: English HoH
 Extras:
 Isolated Score (DTS HD Master Audio 5.1)
 Mysterious Island [Featurette] (11:13)
 The Three Worlds of Gulliver [Featurette] (7:12)
 Earth vs. the Flying Saucers [Featurette] (11:52)
 Theatrical Trailer (2:47, 1080p)
 Case type: Keep Case
 Released: 10 Dec 2013
 Notes: Limited to 3,000 copies (none are numbered).
 Blu-ray series: The Fantastic Films of Ray Harryhausen (along with The 7th Voyage of Sinbad, Jason and the Argonauts and Sinbad and the Eye of the Tiger)

Reception

Critical
The Golden Voyage of Sinbad received favourable reviews from critics. Rotten Tomatoes has given it a rating of 75% from 16 critics with an average rating of 5.6/10.

Box Office
In the United States and Canada, the film was a box office success with a total revenue of $11,000,000, including $5,000,000 in rentals, bringing its total gross to $16,000,000 - the equivalent of $78,227,342 in 2016 dollars. The film was completed for $982,351, a remarkably small sum, even for a film in the early 1970s.

Overseas, the film sold  tickets in the Soviet Union and 527,437 tickets in France, for a combined total of at least  tickets sold overseas.

Columbia did not enjoy the spoils of the film's success as they had sold off all their interest in its 1974 slate to Bright-Persky Associates.

On 25 February 2018, filmmaker John Walsh, a trustee of the Ray and Diana Harryhausen Foundation gave a talk at the historic Regent Street Cinema for a special 45th anniversary screening of a restored version of The Golden Voyage of Sinbad, along with Caroline Munro.

References

Sources

External links
 
 
 
 
 

1973 films
1970s fantasy adventure films
1970s monster movies
American epic films
American fantasy adventure films
American monster movies
British epic films
British fantasy adventure films
British monster movies
1970s English-language films
Columbia Pictures films
Epic fantasy films
Films adapted into comics
Films based on Sinbad the Sailor
Films directed by Gordon Hessler
Films scored by Miklós Rózsa
Films set in the 8th century
Films set in Lemuria (continent)
Films shot in Mallorca
Films shot in Madrid
Films using stop-motion animation
Films produced by Ray Harryhausen
Films with screenplays by Ray Harryhausen
Films produced by Charles H. Schneer
Films set in the Middle Ages
1970s American films
1970s British films